The Baltimore Blackbirds were an indoor football team based in Baltimore, Maryland. They played the 2007 season as an expansion member of the American Indoor Football Association, at the 1st Mariner Arena.

History
The team was originally going to be a member of the Eastern Indoor Football League, but left for the AIFA soon after the "League Showcase/Jamboree" held inside the Mahoning Valley HitMen's "ThunderDome".

The Blackbirds played a predominant road schedule (eight away games, five at home), finishing with a record of 1–12. The team suffered severe financial problems, which resulted in players and coaches not receiving paychecks from their last two games for several months. Simpson resigned as head coach on August 3, 2007, expressing doubt about the future of the team. Three days later the AIFA moved to expel the Blackbirds from the league for breach of contract resulting from the Blackbirds negotiations with other leagues.

The arena lease was held by the league who opted to replace them with a new team which brought about the creation of the Baltimore Mariners.

Season-by-season 

|-
|2007 || 1 || 12 || 0 || 7th Southern || --

2007 season schedule

References

External links
 Official website Website down as of 9/19/07
 Blackbirds' 2007 Stats

American Indoor Football Association teams
American football teams in Baltimore
Defunct American football teams in Maryland
American football teams established in 2007
American football teams disestablished in 2007
2007 establishments in Maryland
2007 disestablishments in Maryland